A moraine-dammed lake occurs when the terminal moraine has prevented some meltwater from leaving the valley.  Its most common shape is that of a long ribbon (ribbon lake). 
Example of moraine dammed lakes include:
Argentina/Chile: General Carrera/Buenos Aires Lake
Chile: Calafquén Lake, Panguipulli Lake 
Ireland: Lough Dan
Nepal: Tsho Rolpa
New Zealand: Lake Hāwea, Lake Ohau, Lake Pukaki, Lake Tekapo, Lake Wakatipu, and Lake Wanaka (i.e., almost all large lakes in the South Island)
Switzerland: Lake Zurich
United States: Donner Lake in California, Flathead Lake in Montana, Mille Lacs Lake in Minnesota, Wallowa Lake in Oregon
Wales: Llyn Peris and its twin Llyn Padarn.
Poland: Morskie Oko in Zakopane
Slovakia: Strbske pleso, Velke Hincovo pleso
In the 19th century the Argentine explorer Francisco Perito Moreno suggested that many Patagonian lakes draining to the Pacific were in fact part of the Atlantic basin but had been moraine dammed during the quaternary glaciations changing their outlets to the west. He argued that as originally belonging to the Atlantic basin these lakes should be awarded to Argentina. Most of the lakes situated in the Himalaya of Nepal and Bhutan are also of the moraine dammed type. They may burst at any time. That is why the areas below such lakes have high risk of flooding.

See also

Glacial landforms

Glaciology  
Moraines
Lakes by type